Elizabeth Velasco is an American politician who is a member of the Colorado House of Representatives for the 57th district. Elected in November 2022, she assumed office on January 9, 2023.

Education 
Velasco earned an associate degree from Colorado Mountain College.

Career 
Outside of politics, Velasco is the CEO of Global Language Services, an organization that provides language interpretation services for government agencies, focus groups, and community events. She served as a public information officer during the Grizzly Creek Fire. Velasco previously worked in hotel management.

References 

Living people
Democratic Party members of the Colorado House of Representatives
Women state legislators in Colorado
21st-century American politicians
21st-century American women politicians
Year of birth missing (living people)